The first season of the Seven Network television series A Place to Call Home, consisting of 13 episodes, premiered on 28 April 2013 and concluded on 21 July 2013.

Production 
A Place to Call Home was announced in Channel Seven's 2012 line-up. Seven Network's Angus Ross said that it would potentially premiere in late 2012, but wouldn't rush the show to air by a certain date unless "casting and other elements" were right.

Plot 
Set in Australia in the 1950s, A Place to Call Home is a compelling and romantic story of one woman's journey to heal her soul and of a privileged family rocked by scandal. Acclaimed actress Marta Dusseldorp leads the cast as Sarah Adams, a woman with a mysterious past who returns to Australia after 20 years in Europe.

Working her passage home aboard an ocean liner, Sarah becomes involved in the lives of the Blighs, a wealthy Australian pastoralist family. She develops an immediate connection with handsome and charming widower George (Brett Climo), as well as his modern young daughter Anna (Abby Earl) and withdrawn daughter-in-law Olivia (Arianwen Parkes-Lockwood). But it is when Sarah unwittingly discovers a potentially scandalous Bligh family secret that her future becomes forever linked with theirs.

Only the uncompromising matriarch of the family, Elizabeth (Noni Hazlehurst), and her grandson James (David Berry), know Sarah has uncovered this family skeleton. Elizabeth is intent on keeping it that way - and Sarah at arm's length. Bearing the scars of war and facing the animosity of a determined matriarch, it is time for Sarah to face life again and begin her journey towards healing and hopefully finding a place to call home.

Cast

Main 
 Marta Dusseldorp as Sarah Adams
 Noni Hazlehurst as Elizabeth Bligh
 Brett Climo as George Bligh
 Craig Hall as Dr. Jack Duncan
 David Berry as James Bligh
 Abby Earl as Anna Bligh
 Arianwen Parkes-Lockwood as Olivia Bligh
 Aldo Mignone as Gino Poletti
 Frankie J. Holden as Roy Briggs

Recurring 
 Deborah Kennedy as Doris Collins
 Krew Boylan as Amy Polson
 Michael Sheasby as Bert Ford
 Dominic Allburn as Harry Polson
 Jacinta Acevski as Alma Grey
 Dina Panozzo as Carla Poletti
 Sara Wiseman as Carolyn Bligh
 Jenni Baird as Regina Standish
 Tristan Maxwell as Colin Walker
 Angelo D'Angelo as Amo Poletti
 Judi Farr as Peg Maloney
 Lisa Peers as Miriam Goldberg
 Kris McQuade as Grace Stevens

Guest 
 Scott Grimley as Norman Parker
 Paul Holmes as Reverend Green
 Erica Lovell as Eve Walker
 Adam Gray as Dr. René Nordmann
 Heather Mitchell as Prudence Swanson
 Nicole Shostak as Maude Carvolth
 Jeremy Lewis Hubbard as Clem
 Avital Greenberg-Teplitsky as Leah Goldberg
 Sean Taylor as Henry Swanson
 Matt Levett as Andrew Swanson
 Siena Elchaar as Gilda Poletti
 Martin Sacks as Itzaak Goldberg
 Russell Queay as William Brackley
 Alan Dearth as Robert Menzies

Notes

Casting 
On 28 June 2012, it was reported that Noni Hazelhurst had been secured in a lead role as Elizabeth Bligh. A week later, on July 8, it was announced that Marta Dusseldorp and Brett Climo had joined Hazelhurst in the lead roles of Sarah Adams and George Bligh, respectively. Frankie J. Holden, David Berry, Arianwen Parkes-Lockwood, Craig Hall, Abby Earl and Aldo Mignone were announced the following day, completing the main cast.

Episodes

References

External links 

 
 

2013 Australian television seasons